Gen. Robert MacFeely House is a historic residence located at 2015 I St., Northwest, Washington, D.C.
The house was built around 1860 and was altered between 1881 and 1929.  It has been listed on the District of Columbia Inventory of Historic Sites since 1983 and it was listed on the National Register of Historic Places in 1989.  The building now serves the Arts Club of Washington.

References

External links
 

Houses completed in 1860
Victorian architecture in Washington, D.C.
Houses on the National Register of Historic Places in Washington, D.C.